Here Come the ABCs is the second children's album and eleventh studio album by alternative rock band They Might Be Giants, aimed at young children learning the alphabet. The CD and DVD were originally released separately, but since have been released together as a combo. There are 25 songs in the CD and 38 in the DVD.

While it was produced and released by Walt Disney Records under their Disney Sound label, the band was reportedly given complete creative control over the project, which at the time was very unusual for Walt Disney Records, which had until then followed a strict artist control policy.  As a result, the DVD features a variety of puppetry, animation and live action supplied by personal friends of the group, including AJ Schnack, who directed the TMBG documentary Gigantic (A Tale of Two Johns).  For guest vocals on a few tracks, they turned to their family: John Flansburgh's wife Robin Goldwasser, and John Linnell's son, Henry. The music videos that appear on the DVD were also aired (in part or whole) on the Disney Channel's children's programming block, Playhouse Disney.

Here Come the ABCs was a great success for They Might Be Giants, the video being certified Gold (sales over 50,000) in 2005. The album reached #1 on Billboard’s Children’s Music charts, won Parenting Magazine’s Children’s DVD of the Year Award and two National Parenting Publications Awards (NAAPA). In addition, Amazon.com called it "the best Children's Music album of 2005" and the 13th best overall album of 2005. Two follow-ups were released, Here Come the 123s in 2008 and Here Comes Science in 2009.

Although the audio-only release is considered to be They Might Be Giants' 11th studio album, some of the songs make little sense without their visual accompaniment.

Track listing

CD
All songs by They Might Be Giants unless otherwise noted.
 "Here Come The ABCs" – 0:11
 "Alphabet Of Nations" – 1:26
 "E Eats Everything" – 2:43
 "Flying V" – 1:34
 "Q U" – 1:09
 "Go For G!" – 1:14
 "Pictures Of Pandas Painting" – 2:07
 "D & W" – 1:37
 "Fake-Believe" – 1:51
 "Can You Find It?" – 2:55
 "The Vowel Family" – 1:59
 "Letter/Not A Letter" – 1:08
 "Alphabet Lost And Found" (Marty Beller) – 2:49
 "I C U" – 1:49
 "Letter Shapes" – 1:22
 "Who Put The Alphabet In Alphabetical Order?" – 1:46
 "Rolling O" – 1:26
 "L M N O" – 1:43
 "C Is For Conifers" – 2:37
 "Fake-Believe (Type B)" – 1:56
 "D Is For Drums" – 2:21
 "Z Y X" – 1:21
 "Goodnight My Friends" – 0:25
 "Clap Your Hands" – 1:21
A bonus track
 "Here In Higglytown (Theme To Playhouse Disney's Higglytown Heroes)" (Dan Miller, They Might Be Giants) – 0:58
A bonus track

DVD
 "Here Come The ABCs" 0:25
 "Alphabet Of Nations" 1:26
 "E Eats Everything" 2:43
 "Flying V" 1:34
 "I Am A Robot" 1:29
 "Q U" 1:09
 "Go For G!" 1:14
 "Pictures Of Pandas Painting" 2:07
 "D & W" 1:37
 "Fake-Believe" 1:51
 "Can You Find It?" 2:55
 Introducing The Vowel Family 0:11
 "The Vowel Family" 1:59
 "A To Z" 0:24
 "Letter/Not A Letter" 1:08
 "Letter Shapes" 1:22
 "Alphabet Lost And Found" (Marty Beller) 2:49
 "I C U" 1:49
 "I Am A Robot (Type B)" 0:56
 John And John Introduce... 0:10
 "Who Put The Alphabet In Alphabetical Order?" 1:46
 "Rolling O" 1:26
 "L M N O" 1:43
 Introducing C Is For Conifers 0:12
 "C Is For Conifers" 2:37
 "Fake-Believe (Type B)" 1:56
 "A To Z (Type B)" 0:29
 "D Is For Drums" 2:21
 Introducing Z Y X 0:09
 "Z Y X" 1:21
 "Goodnight My Friends" 0:25
 "Here Come The ABCs (Reprise)" 0:11
 Introducing The Bonus Tracks 0:14
 "Clap Your Hands" 1:21
 "Violin" 3:33
 "Stalk Of Wheat" 1:19
 "Here In Higglytown (Theme To Playhouse Disney's Higglytown Heroes)" 2:05
 "End Credits" 2:15

Exclusive bonus tracks
Special editions with exclusive bonus tracks were produced for various outlets.  Bonus tracks include:

 "Hovering Sombrero '05" on the Amazon.com CD, "I Never Go To Work" on the Best Buy CD; both songs appear on the Amazon.com CD/DVD combo release
 2 exclusive videos for "Violin", "Stalk of Wheat" on the Amazon.com DVD; 2 more exclusive videos, along with the other 2, "Robot Parade" and "Sleepwalkers" appear on the Amazon.com CD/DVD combo release
 An iTunes single was released for "T-Shirt" as a companion to Here Come the ABCs. According to an early tracklisting posted online, the song was meant to be sequenced between "D Is For Drums" and "Z Y X", but was cut for unknown reasons.

Personnel

They Might Be Giants
 John Flansburgh – lead and backing vocals, guitar
 John Linnell – lead and backing vocals, piano, accordion, saxophone
Additional musicians
 Dan Miller – guitar, piano
 Danny Weinkauf – bass guitar
 Marty Beller – drums, lead vocals on "Alphabet Lost and Found"
 Dan Levine – trombone on "D & W", "Letter/Not A Letter", "Rolling O" and "A to Z (Type B)", tuba on "Flying V", "Go for G" and "Fake Believe (Part 1)"
 Mark Pender – trumpet on "D & W", "Letter/Not A Letter", "Rolling O" and "A to Z (Type B)"
 Dan Hickey – drums on "Clap Your Hands"
 Pat Dillet – piano on "Goodnight My Friends"
 Robin Goldwasser – lead vocals on "Who Put the Alphabet in Alphabetical Order?"
 Henry Linnell – lead vocals on "Letter/Not A Letter"
 Desi Tomaselli – lead vocals on "Letter/Not A Letter
Production
 Pat Dillet, They Might Be Giants - producers

Production Crew
 Executive Producer: David Agnew
 Audio Engineer/Mixer: Pat Dillett
 Audio Mastering: UE Nastosi at Sterling Sound Studios NYC
 Recorded at: Kampo Studios and Skyline Studios, Manhattan, New York
 Additional Recording at: Collier Brothers Studios and Hello Studios, Brooklyn, New York
 Band Manager: Jamie Lincoin Kitman at Homblow Studios USA

Video Production Crew
 Music Performed by They Might Be Giants
 DVD Produced by Bonfire Films of America
 Directed by AJ Schnack
 Starring Chris Anderson, John Flansburgh, John Linnell, AD Miles
 Animated by Courtney Booker, Euan Mitchell, Greg Rozum and Divya Srinivasan
 Animation Produced at Asterisk, The Chopping Block Studios Inc. and Colourmovie

In popular culture
"Clap Your Hands" was featured when the band made a guest appearance on the final episode of Blue's Clues, titled "Bluestock".
"Can You Find It?" was featured on the soundtrack to the movie Wordplay.
"Robot Parade" was featured during the credits to an episode of the animated television series The Simpsons, titled "Them, Robot".

References

External links
 Disney Records site for the album
 Official band-operated download site
 Here Come The ABCs page at This Might Be A Wiki
 This Might be a Wiki TMBG fan knowledgebase

2005 albums
They Might Be Giants albums
Albums produced by Pat Dillett
Children's music albums by American artists
2005 video albums
Walt Disney Records video albums
Idlewild Recordings albums
Kindie rock albums
Disney Sound albums